The 2005 Icelandic Men's Football League Cup was the tenth staging of the Icelandic Men's League Cup, a pre-season professional football competition in Iceland. The competition started on 19 February 2005  and concluded on 5 May 2006 with KR beating Þróttur 3-2 in the final.

Details
 The 16 teams were divided into 2 groups of 8 teams. Each team plays one match with other teams in the group once. The top 4 teams from each group qualified for the quarter-finals.

Group stage

Group A

Group B

Knockout stage

Quarter-finals

Semi-finals

Final

See also
Icelandic Men's Football Cup
Knattspyrnusamband Íslands - The Icelandic Football Association
Icelandic First Division League 2005

References
RSSSF Page - Deildabikar 2005

2005 domestic association football cups
2005 in Icelandic football
Icelandic Men's Football League Cup